Shavkat Raimqulov (born 7 May 1984) is an Uzbekistani professional footballer. He last played for Bukhoro. He plays as a defender.

Career
Raimqulov has made appearances for the Uzbekistan national football team. He also appeared for Uzbekistan U-20 at the 2003 FIFA World Youth Championship in UAE.

Honours

Club

Bunyodkor
 Uzbek League (2): 2008, 2009
 Uzbek Cup (1): 2008

Nasaf
 Uzbek Cup runners-up (1): 2012

References

External links 

1984 births
Living people
Uzbekistani footballers
Uzbekistan international footballers
FK Andijon players
traktor Tashkent players
navbahor Namangan players
FC Bunyodkor players
FC Shurtan Guzar players
FC Nasaf players
buxoro FK players
2004 AFC Asian Cup players
Association football defenders